Iiro Järvinen (born 3 November 1996) is a Finnish professional footballer who plays as a midfielder for Veikkausliiga club KuPS.

External links 
 

1996 births
Sportspeople from Jyväskylä
Living people
Finnish footballers
Finland youth international footballers
Finland under-21 international footballers
Association football midfielders
JJK Jyväskylä players
FC Ilves players
Kuopion Palloseura players
Veikkausliiga players
Ykkönen players
21st-century Finnish people